Poeoptera is a genus of bird in the starling family. It contains three species, all live in forest habitats in Africa. These starlings nest in tree cavities, such as old woodpecker or barbet holes. One species, the narrow-tailed starling, nests in colonies. All are birds of the canopy, and their diet is mostly or entirely fruit. Males have a glossier appearance than females.

Species
 Kenrick's starling (Poeoptera kenricki)
 Narrow-tailed starling (Poeoptera lugubris)
 Stuhlmann's starling (Poeoptera stuhlmanni)

References
 

 
Bird genera
Sturnidae
 
Taxa named by Charles Lucien Bonaparte
Taxonomy articles created by Polbot